24 Oras (pronounced as bente kwatro oras / ) is a Philippine television news broadcasting show broadcast by GMA Network. Originally anchored by Mel Tiangco and Mike Enriquez, it premiered on March 15, 2004, on the network's Telebabad line up, replacing Frontpage: Ulat ni Mel Tiangco. Tiangco, Enriquez and Vicky Morales currently serve as the anchors.

The show is streaming online on YouTube.

Overview
24 Oras premiered on March 15, 2004, broadcasting from Studio 2 of GMA Network Center, replacing the news program Frontpage: Ulat ni Mel Tiangco. Mel Tiangco and Mike Enriquez served as anchors, while Pia Guanio served as the anchor for the segment Showbiz Time (later Chika Minute).

On February 21, 2011, studio filming location for the program moved to Studio 5 of GMA Network Center. On June 4, 2012, the weather forecasting segment I.M. Ready: GMA Weather was launched, featuring Nathaniel Cruz as the anchor. On November 10, 2014, Vicky Morales was hired an anchor. On May 29, 2015, Guanio left the program. Iya Villania was hired as the new Chika Minute anchor on June 15, 2015. On August 24, 2018, Atom Araullo served as a substitute anchor for Enriquez, who went on medical leave. Enriquez returned to the program on November 26, 2018.

In March 2020, due to the enhanced community quarantine in Luzon caused by the COVID-19 pandemic; Enriquez temporarily took a break from the program, Tiangco anchored the segment Kapusong Totoo through voice recording, Araullo and Jessica Soho served as anchors along with Morales and Villania and Cruz started anchoring their segments through their respective home. In April 2020, the program added sign language interpreters. On June 1, 2020, Enriquez, Tiangco and Cruz returned to anchor from the studio set of the program. On October 11, 2021, Kim Atienza joined the program to anchor the #KuyaKimAnoNa segment.

In December 2021, Enriquez took another medical leave from the show. He returned to the show on March 28, 2022. However, Enriquez would left the newscast by mid-August 2022, leaving Tiangco and Morales as the main anchors.

Anchors

 Mel Tiangco 
 Mike Enriquez 
 Vicky Morales 
 Nathaniel "Mang Tani" Cruz 
 Iya Villania 
 Kim Atienza 
 Chino Trinidad 

Former anchors
 Pia Guanio 
 Atom Araullo 

Interim anchors
 Connie Sison 
 Jessica Soho 
 Atom Araullo 
 Arnold Clavio 
 Kara David 
 Ivan Mayrina 
 Mariz Umali 
 Pia Arcangel 
 Jun Veneracion 
 Raffy Tima 
 Emil Sumangil 
 Chino Gaston

Segments
 #BosesMo
 Chika Minute
 Chika In A Minute
 Good News
 I.M. Ready, GMA Weather
 Kapusong Totoo
 Special Report
 Sumbungan ng Bayan
 Time Out
 #KuyaKimAnoNa

Defunct
 Alerto 24
 Atomic Sports
 Balitang Abroad
 Bantay Probinsya
 Huli Cam
 Imbestigador ng Bayan
 Newsflash
 Pampa Good Vibes
 Patok of the Town
 Showbiz Time
 #SummerVibes
 Usapang Pets
 Viral na 'To!
 YouScoop
 Pagbangon
 Ronda Probinsya
 ThinkTok

24 Oras Weekend

Originally anchored by Pia Arcangel and Jiggy Manicad, the weekend edition of 24 Oras premiered on February 21, 2010, on the network's Saturday and Sunday evening line up replacing GMA Weekend Report. On April 21, 2018, Manicad left the show for his senatorial candidacy. In August 2018, Ivan Mayrina became an anchor. Arcangel and Mayrina currently serve as the anchors.

Anchors
 Pia Arcangel 
 Ivan Mayrina 
 Nelson Canlas 

Former anchors
 Jiggy Manicad 
 Grace Lee 
 Luane Dy 
 Cata Tibayan 

Interim anchors
 Mariz Umali

Ratings
According to AGB Nielsen Philippines' Mega Manila household television ratings, the premiere of 24 Oras Weekend earned an 18.4% rating.

Accolades

Regional versions
 24 Oras Amianan
 24 Oras Bikol
 24 Oras Central Visayas
 24 Oras Davao
 24 Oras Ilokano
 24 Oras North Central Luzon
 24 Oras Northern Mindanao
 24 Oras Southern Mindanao
 24 Oras Western Visayas
 Ratsada 24 Oras

See also
 List of accolades received by 24 Oras

Notes

References

External links
 
 
 

2004 Philippine television series debuts
Filipino-language television shows
Flagship evening news shows
GMA Network news shows
GMA Integrated News and Public Affairs shows
Philippine television news shows
Sign language television shows